Norbert Dickel (born 27 November 1961 in Bad Berleburg) is a retired German football player. He spent six seasons in the Bundesliga with 1. FC Köln and Borussia Dortmund. He scored two goals in the final of the 1988–89 DFB-Pokal in 1989 for Borussia, helping them to obtain the first major trophy since 1966. He had to retire at 28 years of age due to injuries.

Since 1992 he is announcer in the stadium of Borussia Dortmund and since 2000 commentator for the internet-radio broadcasts of Borussia Dortmund games as well as representing the club on the road.

Honours
1. FC Köln
 UEFA Cup runner-up: 1985–86

Borussia Dortmund
 DFB-Pokal: 1988–89

References

External links
 
 

1961 births
Living people
German footballers
Germany under-21 international footballers
Sportfreunde Siegen players
1. FC Köln players
Borussia Dortmund players
Bundesliga players
Association football forwards
Borussia Dortmund non-playing staff
West German footballers
People from Siegen-Wittgenstein
Sportspeople from Arnsberg (region)
Footballers from North Rhine-Westphalia